Yevgeny Valentinovich Maslov (1945 – 2 November 2011), anglicized as Eugene, was a Russian billiards coach. He trained several notable players and coaches. His students included Diana Mironova, George Maslov and Vadim Berdyshev.

Maslov died on 2 November 2011 aged 66.

References

1945 births
2011 deaths
Pool coaches, managers and promoters
Place of birth missing
Place of death missing
Date of birth missing